Joy Sunday (born September 25, 1996) is an American actress. She has performed in television notably in Dear White People and Wednesday. In film, she is known for side roles in Bad Hair, Shithouse, and Dog.

Early life and education
Sunday was born in Staten Island, New York to a Nigerian family. She studied theater in high school at Fiorello H. LaGuardia High School in New York City, before going to study at USC School of Cinematic Arts in Los Angeles, graduating with a degree in critical studies. Outside of academia, she worked as a filmmaker with Tribeca Film Institute on the side, working on several shorts.

Career
Sunday made her television debut in an episode of MacGyver in 2018, where she appeared in one episode. She joined the Screen Actors Guild in 2020 with her performance in Bad Hair. She had a side role as Sophia in the 2020 film Shithouse. She had an appearance in one episode of the Netflix series Dear White People.

Sunday followed that up with side roles in the  film The Beta Test and Dog. She broke out appearing in the supporting role of Bianca Barclay in the 2022 Netflix series Wednesday directed by Tim Burton.

Filmography

Film

Television

References

External links
 
 

1995 births
Living people
People from Staten Island
21st-century American actors
American film actors
American television actors
American people of Nigerian descent
USC School of Cinematic Arts alumni
Fiorello H. LaGuardia High School alumni